Janko Polić Kamov (17 November 1886 – 8 August 1910) was a Croatian writer and poet. His literary work was small, but very significant, because in his poems and plays he expressed his anger and displeasure over hypocrisy and injustice of his contemporaries in a way unprecedented in Croatian literature. His masterwork is a modernist novel Isušena kaljuža (1906–1909) saturated with psychosexual and spiritual conflicts of the iconoclastic first-person narrator and later described as a proto-existentialist prose, written decades before the literary movement's appearance. Kamov's novel, invariably described as the premier Croatian avant-garde major prose work, was printed for the first time in 1956. Because of that he earned reputation as one of the greatest rebels and iconoclasts in history of Croatian culture.

Biography
He was born in Sušak, Rijeka. Rebellious by nature, he was expelled from Rijeka high school and dropped out of the school in Zagreb. Because of his participation in the demonstration against the Hungarian governor in Croatia, Khuen-Héderváry, he was sentenced to three months in prison in 1903. Headstrong and temperamental, he called himself Kamov, after Ham (or Kam) from the Old Testament, who saw his father Noah naked but unlike his siblings Shem and Japhet did not cover his nakedness, thus issuing a curse. Kamov probably saw himself as a revealer of bourgeoise hypocrisy and wrote to his brother Vladimir in 1910 - "Kamov to me is a literary program..."

Legacy
Kamov is treated as a very special writer within Croatian literature. His writings have been variously labeled as proto-modernist, avant-garde, absurdist, existentialist, futurist and surrealist, and is considered to be a highly original author for the period. His work paved way and influenced later Croatian authors such as Miroslav Krleža and Antun Branko Šimić. A number of his works have been translated into English during the 90s such as Sloboda (Freedom) or Žalost (Sorrow), which led the American literary theorist Geoffrey Hartman to describe him as the biggest literary discovery during that period.

Works

Poetry
Psovka (Curse), (Zagreb, 1907) 
Ištipana hartija, (Zagreb, 1907)

Short stories
Ćaskanja, Izdanje knjižare G. Trbojevića, Rijeka, 1914.
Ecce Homo
Brada
Sloboda
Žalost
Katastrofa
Bitanga
Žena
Odijelo
Stjenica

Drama
Iznakaženi (written, 17 and 18 December 1904)
Tragedija mozgova: tri scene (Zagreb, 1907)
Na rođenoj grudi: dramatizovana studija (Zagreb, 1907)
Samostanske drame, 1908.
Orgije monaha
Djevica
Čovječanstvo, 1908.
Mamino srce, 1910.

Novels
Isušena kaljuža ("A Dried Mire"; 1906–1909)

References

External links

 Janko Polić Kamov, unofficial webpage, includes Kamov work  

1886 births
1910 deaths
Writers from Rijeka
Croatian dramatists and playwrights
Croatian novelists
Male novelists
Croatian male poets
20th-century Croatian poets
20th-century novelists
20th-century dramatists and playwrights
20th-century male writers